10 My Me (stylized as ) is Japanese pop girl group Morning Musume's tenth studio album. It was released March 17, 2010 in both a regular and limited edition. The normal edition came with a photocard, depicting a similar picture to the limited edition cover. The limited edition was packaged with a bonus DVD and had a different, black cover. The album contains vocals from former member Koharu Kusumi who graduated from the group in December 2009; she is not credited.

Writing and development
On December 30, 2009, along with the announcement of then-forthcoming release of their forty-second single, "Onna ga Medatte Naze Ikenai", it was also announced that the group would be releasing their tenth studio album on March 17, 2010. According to Tsunku, "Genki Pikappika!" was originally chosen as the opening track for the album; however, he felt that "Moonlight Night (Tsukiyo no Ban da yo)" was a better choice.
The Chinese version of "Ame no Furanai Hoshi de wa Aisenai Darō?" was included in the album as a chance to give the two Chinese members, Junjun and Linlin, a chance to shine and challenge the other members.

Singles
"Shōganai Yume Oibito" was released as the album's lead single in Japan on May 13, 2009 and topped the Oricon single chart. This became their first number-one single since 2006's "Aruiteru" and extended their record for having the most number-one singles for a female group.

The second single was "Nanchatte Ren'ai", released on August 12, 2009, nearly 3 months after the release of "Shōganai Yume Oibito". It debuted at number-two on the Oricon single chart. This made them the second group to have forty Top 10 singles since their debut after Japanese pop boy band SMAP, who accomplished this feat back in October 2006.

The third single, "Kimagure Princess", was released on October 28, 2009 and would be the last single for Koharu Kusumi, who joined the group as the only seventh generation member in 2005. "Kimagure Princess" debuted at number four on the Oricon charts.

"Onna ga Medatte Naze Ikenai" was the last single from the album, released on February 10, 2010. The single debuted at number five on the charts.

Promotion

In order to promote the album, Morning Musume appeared on various TV shows such as, Samma no Mamma, MuJack, and Waratte Iitomo. The group appeared at a 3D fashion concert and performed their 2000 hit song "Ren'ai Revolution 21". Risa Niigaki and Aika Mitsui also worked part-time as cashiers for two hours at Tower Records in Shibuya on the day of the album's release. The album was further promoted by their spring concert tour, titled Pikappika!, which began on March 19, 2010.

Track listing

Chart performance
On the day of its release, 10 My Me debuted at number seven on the Oricon daily chart. At the end of the week, the album debuted at number nine on the weekly chart with 12,103 copies sold.

Charts

Personnel

Akiko – Hair & make-up
Kazuyoshi Araki – A&R
Yutaka Asahina – Producer's assistant
Shirohide Azuma – Art direction & design
Misako Fukuda – Sales promotion
Shin Hashimoto – Label manager
Miyuki Ito – Promotion
Junjun – Vocal
Koji Kamada – Director
Eri Kamei – vocal
Kazuhito Kawata – sales promotion
Ayaka Kitayama – Producer's assistant
Shinnosuke Kobayashi – Recording coordination
Koharu Kusumi (uncredited) – vocal
Linlin – vocal
Yasuji Yasman Maeda – Mastering engineer
Kazumi Matsui – Recording engineer
Sayumi Michishige – vocal, backing vocal
Aika Mitsui – vocal
Shuhei Miyachi – promotion
Yoji Mochida – Artist producer
Tomoko Nakamura – promotion
Risa Niigaki – vocal
Kōichi Nishikata – Chief producer
Yusuke Ogawa – Assistant engineer
Toshiya Ohta – hair & make-up

Haruka Okayasu – promotion
Makoto Okuguchi – photographer
Yuichi Otsubo – recording engineer
Mitsuhiro Sagara – producer's management
Hiroharu Saito – hair & make-up
Yasuhiro Saito – Art direction & design
Yukina Saito – Management
Yukio Seto – Label producer
Maki Shoji – Promotion desk
Hiromi Sugusawa – Sales promotion desk
Takauki Suzuki – management
Ai Takahashi – vocal, backing vocal
Satoru Takase – Stylist
Sho Takimoto – art direction & design
Reina Tanaka – vocal
Tsunku – Record producer, writer, composer
Shiina Ueki – A&R coordination desk
Nobuyasu Umemoto – producer's management
Ryo Wakizaka – recording engineer
Chihiro Watanabe – promotion
Eito Watanabe – hair & make-up
Atsushi Yamaguchi – assistant engineer
Naoki Yamazaki – Executive producer
Takeshi Yanagisawa – recording engineer
Sayaka Yoshida – promotion desk

Release history

References

External links
 10 My Me  Hello! Project page 
  10 My Me Up-Front Works page 
  Tsunku blog entry about 10 My Me 

2010 albums
Morning Musume albums
Zetima albums
Japanese-language albums
Albums produced by Tsunku